Volodymyr Petrovych Salsky (July 24, 1885 in Ostroh, Volhynian Governorate – October 5, 1940 in Warsaw) was a Ukrainian general, minister of defense, head of the Ukrainian government in exile.

Salsky was born in the old city of Ostroh. In 1906 he finished the Vilna Infantry Cadet School and served in the 126th Infantry Rylsk Regiment. After graduating from the Nikolayev Academy of General Staff in 1912 he was commissioned as a company commander of the 132 Infantry Bendery Regiment, becoming the chief of staff of the infantry division. During World War I Salsky served at the General Staff of Military Intelligence department of the Kiev Military District and a quartermaster of the 12th Army in the Baltics.

In January 1918 Salsky moved to Kiev where he became a chief of staff of the capital city's armed forces, participating in the fight against the Bolshevik forces of Mikhail Muravyov. During the times of Ukrainian State he was appointed the chief of staff of the 1st Serdyuk Division. He also was a member of the Commission in organization of military schools and academies in Ukraine. During the Anti-Hetman Uprising in November 1918 with the rest of Division Salsky changed sides.

In the army of the UPR, he became in May 1919 Commander of the Zaporozhian Army Group, from September 23, 1919 Commander of the Army of the UPR, and in November 1919, Minister of Military Affairs of the UPR in the government of Borys Martos.

At the end of 1920 he was interned in a Polish camp in Kalisz. After his release, he settled in Warsaw. Here he was an active participant in the public-political life of the Ukrainian diaspora and he bore the title of Minister of Defense of the Government in exile.

He died on October 5, 1940 and was buried in Warsaw at the Volia cemetery.

References 

 Volodymyr Salsky at the web-page of Doctor of Historical Sciences of National Academy of Sciences of Ukraine Pavlo Hai-Nyzhnyk.
 "To the Unknown Cossack" - the Orthodox Cemetery in Warsaw, a photo of Salsky's grave at the Polish cemetery

1885 births
1940 deaths
People from Ostroh
People from Volhynian Governorate
Ukrainian people in the Russian Empire
Defence ministers of Ukraine
Imperial Russian Army generals
Russian military personnel of World War I
Ukrainian people of World War I
Ukrainian generals
Recipients of the Order of St. Vladimir, 4th class
Chevaliers of the Légion d'honneur